Jason Kropf is an American politician and attorney serving as a member of the Oregon House of Representatives from the 54th district. Elected in 2020, he assumed office in January 2021.

Early life and education 
Kropf is a fifth-generation resident of Oregon. Raised in Southern Oregon, he earned a Bachelor of Arts degree in philosophy from Oregon State University and a Juris Doctor from the University of Oregon School of Law.

Career 
Prior to entering politics, Kropf worked as a public defender and deputy district attorney in Deschutes County, Oregon. Elected in the 2020 general election, Kropf defeated incumbent Republican Cheri Helt. He assumed office in January 2021.

Personal life 
Kropf lives in Bend, Oregon, with his wife and daughter.

References 

Democratic Party members of the Oregon House of Representatives
People from Bend, Oregon
Oregon State University alumni
University of Oregon School of Law alumni
Oregon lawyers
Year of birth missing (living people)
Living people